The Shadowmancer Returns is the fourth novel in Graham Taylor's Shadowmancer series, following Tersias, and a direct sequel to Shadowmancer.

Plot summary 
In this sequel to Shadowmancer, Thomas, Kate, and Raphah flee from the evil sorcerer Demurral and head to London with Jacob Crane. But once there, their ship is seized and they are lured into the dark heart of the city. Further north, Raphah and Beadle set off on a terrifying journey in search of their friends; a journey haunted by mysterious enemies and a shadowy beast intent on their doom.

Cultural references 
Several myths and legends are incorporated into the story, such as The Wandering Jew, The Holy Grail and Black Dogs.  Furthermore, Beadle remembers meeting a man from eastern Europe, who came to Whitby via shipwreck with a black dog - a reference to Bram Stoker's novel Dracula where the Count arrives at Whitby from a shipwreck in the shape of an enormous black dog.

2007 British novels
2007 children's books
British children's novels
British fantasy novels
Children's fantasy novels
Christian novels
Christian children's books
Faber and Faber books